Onur Capin (born 10 July 1996) is a German footballer who plays as a forward for Arminia Hannover.

Career
In January 2017, Capin left Werder Bremen II for Tuzlaspor of the TFF Second League, the Turkish third tier.

In January 2018, he returned to Germany joining fourth-tier side Lüneburger SK Hansa.

References

External links
 

1996 births
Living people
Footballers from Hanover
Turkish footballers
German footballers
Association football forwards
SV Werder Bremen II players
Tuzlaspor players
Lüneburger SK Hansa players
Hannoverscher SC players
SV Arminia Hannover players
3. Liga players
Regionalliga players
TFF Second League players